The commune of Shombo is a commune of Karuzi Province in central Burundi. The capital lies at Shombo.

References

Communes of Burundi
Karuzi Province